CyberTiger (also known as Cyber Tiger Woods Golf) is a 1999 golf video game featuring Tiger Woods, for PlayStation, Nintendo 64 and Game Boy Color. Woods is the main opponent and best-rated player in the game.

Gameplay
The main objective is to play in tournaments through each circuit and defeat Cyber Tiger and other golfers to win the championship as a professional in career mode. This is the first game to feature Tiger Woods as a character in video game other than Tiger Woods PGA Tour.

Players begin as either Tiger Woods or a created character on Spyglass Hill, the featured golf course in the game. After winning in the Career mode, players can unlock the other championship courses. The Career mode begins players as children, from which they may earn their way to adulthood. Players start off on the Junior Tour as young golfers playing in a one-round tournament. After that, players compete in three more tournaments. Winning any one of them allows players to go to the Amateur Tour, where they must win one of two events to qualify for the Pro Tour. After that, cash is awarded for winning.

CyberTiger includes Power-Up Balls which may give players an advantage or rescue them in desperate times. Balls include "superballs" that bounce on any terrain, and eyeballs that go straight during their flight. Other options include SuperDrive, hidden tricks, hidden golfers and power-ups. The game also introduces Tiger Control, which allows players to put spin (topspin and backspin) on the ball while it is in flight; real-time analog swing and ball control; and the ability to fade or draw. CyberTiger supports vibration feedback devices as well as analog control. In addition, two blocks of memory are required for saving and a Multi Tap compatible adapter is needed for play by up to four players.

Reception

The game received "mixed" reviews on all platforms according to the review aggregation website GameRankings.

See also
Tiger Woods PGA Tour 2000

References

External links

1999 video games
Game Boy Color games
Golf video games
Multiplayer and single-player video games
Nintendo 64 games
PlayStation (console) games
Tiger Woods video games
Video games developed in the United States
Xantera games